Luvsan-Ishiin Sergelenbaatar (born 3 December 1967) is a Mongolian wrestler. He competed in the men's freestyle 48 kg at the 1996 Summer Olympics.

References

External links
 

1967 births
Living people
Mongolian male sport wrestlers
Olympic wrestlers of Mongolia
Wrestlers at the 1996 Summer Olympics
Place of birth missing (living people)
20th-century Mongolian people
21st-century Mongolian people